The eighth season of Tyler Perry's House of Payne began airing on May 25, 2021 and concluded on January 18, 2022. It stars LaVan Davis as Curtis Payne, Cassi Davis as Ella Payne, Allen Payne as CJ Payne, Lance Gross as Calvin Payne, Larramie "Doc" Shaw as Malik Payne, Keshia Knight Pulliam as Miranda Payne and Palmer Williams Jr. as Floyd Jackson, and consists of 22 episodes. The season also features Demetria McKinney as Janine Payne and China Anne McClain as Jazmin Payne in reduced capacities.

Episodes

References

Tyler Perry's House of Payne seasons
2021 American television seasons
2022 American television seasons